Yelsk District or Jelski Rajon is a district of Gomel Region, in Belarus. Seat is at Yelsk.

Districts of Gomel Region